Pradhaan Air Express (IATA: 6P ICAO: PRX) is a cargo airline based in Delhi, India. The airline received its first A320-200P2F aircraft in July 2022  and launched its commercial operations on 1 October 2022.

History
Pradhaan Air Express received NOC from Ministry of Civil Aviation in July 2022 and the same month, the airline received its first A320 P2F aircraft. The airline plans to expand the fleet to four aircraft by 2023.

On 1 October 2022, the airline commenced it commercial operations by operating flight on Delhi to Mumbai sector.

Pradhaan Air Express operated its first commercial international flight on 10-Oct-2022, with the launch of Delhi-Hanoi cargo service operated with A320P2F equipment.

Fleet
As of July 2022, Pradhaan Air Express has the following aircraft in its fleet:

See also
List of airlines of India

References

Airlines established in 2021
Indian companies established in 2021
Airlines of India
Indian brands
Low-cost carriers
Regional airlines